SM U-28 may refer to:
 SM U-28 (Germany), a Type U 27 submarine launched in 1913 and sunk in 1917
 SM U-28 (Austria-Hungary), a U-27 class submarine of the Austro-Hungarian Navy

See also
 German submarine U-28, a list of German submarines named U-28